August, is a novel written by Judith Rossner focused on a psychoanalyst and one of her analysands.  The title refers to the month of August, when analysts leave the city for the month and thus leave some of their patients without the emotional support of the analytic relationship.

Plot introduction 
The novel focuses on the relationship between a psychoanalyst, Dr. Lulu Shinefield, and a young troubled woman, Dawn Henley, from the beginning of their therapy together through to its termination.

Characters 
 Lulu Kagan Shinefield: Main character and psychoanalyst which the book centers on
 Anita Kagan: Lulu's mother
 George Kagan: Lulu's father
 Luther "Woody" Samuelson: Lulu's first husband
 Sascha Shinefield: Lulu's daughter by her first husband
 Nathan Shinefield: Lulu's second husband
 Teddy Shinefield: Lulu's son by her second husband
 Walden Shinefield: Lulu's son by her second husband
 Bonnie and Duke Mayer: Friends of Lulu's and fellow analysts
 Dawn Henley: The other main character of the novel and Dr. Shinefield's analysand
 Vera Henley: Dawn's adoptive "father", but actually her aunt
 Tony Lubovitz: Dawn's adoptive "mother" and partner to Vera prior to separation
 Leonard Silverstein: Tony's husband following her separation from Vera
 Gordon Henley: Dawn's biological father
 Gregory Barnes: Gordon's homosexual partner
 Miranda Lewis Henley: Dawn's biological mother
 Nell Lewis: Miranda's sister
 Mavis McLeod Hagerty: First housekeeper and sitter for Dawn following her mother's death
 Caitlin Hagerty: Second housekeeper and sitter for Dawn as an infant, and cousin to Mavis
 Dr. Leif Seaver: Dawn's former analyst
 Alan Gartner: Dawn's early boyfriend and biological father of her aborted child
 Rob Grace: Another boyfriend of Dawn's
 Tom Grace: Another of Dawn's lovers, and father to Rob Grace
 Bill Denton: Another boyfriend of Dawn's
 Jack Stewart: Final boyfriend of Dawn's mentioned in the novel
 Polly Campbell, Lillian, Jessica Rubenstein, Sandy: Friends of Dawn's

Reception
The New York Times reviewer Walter Kendrick praised the book for "almost photographic realism" in showing life on Manhattan's Upper West Side and in East Hampton, as well as its depiction of the relationship between analyst and patient. The reviewer concluded, "I know of no other account, imagined or factual, that gives such a vivid picture of the analytic experience, on both sides of its intense, troubled, ambiguous relationship."  Norman N. Holland, in his 1990 Holland's Guide to Psychoanalytic Psychology and Literature-and-Psychology, wrote that August, though a "pop novel", provided an "accurate picture of a New York psychoanalysis today" and "a fascinating study of separation anxiety". UPI reviewer David R. Schweisberg likewise credited the book's writing and its portrayal of psychology, but he felt that Rossner had pursued "realism and nuance at the expense of leaving the reader behind", making the book "boring".

References 

1983 American novels
Novels about psychoanalysis
Houghton Mifflin books